Parabuthus transvaalicus (known as the Transvaalicus thick-tailed scorpion, South African thick tail, or giant deathstalker) is a species of venomous scorpion from semi-arid parts of southern Africa.

Description
Its pincers are thin, but its tail is thickened, with the sting segment being as wide as the rest of the tail. It is nocturnal, resting in a shallow burrow under rocks during the day. It resembles its congener P. villosus, which is less strictly nocturnal, hairier and has a more westerly distribution.

Distribution
Parabuthus transvaalicus is found in deserts, scrublands and semi-arid regions of Botswana, Mozambique, Zimbabwe, some parts of the Namib Desert and South Africa.

Sting
Parabuthus transvaalicus is a dangerous medically significant scorpion, which can both sting and spray its kurtoxin venom. The first droplet of venom differs from the rest, and is referred to as "pre-venom".

References

External links

transvaalicus
Arachnids of Africa
Animals described in 1899